Jason L. Lambert (born September 23, 1977) is a retired American mixed martial artist. A professional from 2001 until 2013, he competed for the UFC, WEC, Bellator, King of the Cage, and AFC. He is the former WEC light heavyweight champion.

Mixed martial arts career

World Extreme Cagefighting
Lambert made his WEC debut facing Matt Horwich at WEC 12: Halloween Fury 3 on October 21, 2004. He won his debut via submission (punches) in the second round. He then faced Richard Montoya at WEC 13 on January 22, 2005, for the vacant WEC Light Heavyweight Championship. He won the fight via submission (punches).

Ultimate Fighting Championship
Lambert made his debut in the UFC at UFC 58: USA vs. Canada as a late replacement for The Ultimate Fighter 2 cast member Seth Petruzelli, who suffered a concussion while training and had to withdraw from the bout.  Lambert's debut was successful, submitting his opponent, Rob MacDonald, early in the first round.

Lambert fought again at UFC 59, defeating Terry Martin by technical knockout at 2:37 of round two.  This was a preliminary fight that did not air on the pay-per-view broadcast.  His next fight, against Branden Lee Hinkle at Ultimate Fight Night 5, marked Lambert's third consecutive UFC victory.  Despite this initial win streak, he was not seen on a live UFC pay-per-view broadcast until UFC 63, where he lost to Rashad Evans by knockout in the second round.  At UFC 68, Lambert defeated veteran and former title challenger Renato "Babalu" Sobral in a stunning upset by second-round knockout.

Lambert was scheduled to fight Wilson Gouveia at UFC 76: Knockout, but the bout was rescheduled to UFC 80: Rapid Fire after Gouveia suffered an injury in training. Lambert was knocked out by Gouveia by a left hook which, ironically, was identitical to the hook used by Lambert in his last fight to finish Renato Sobral.

Lambert then lost at UFC 85: Bedlam via TKO at the hands of Luiz Cané at 2:07 of the first round. Lambert moved down to the Middleweight division, and fought Canadian Jason MacDonald at UFC 88: Breakthrough in Atlanta, Georgia, on September 6, 2008. He lost by rear-naked choke in the second round.

After the loss to MacDonald that marked his third straight defeat, the UFC has released Lambert from his contract, saying that he "needed to get more wins".

Post-UFC
In his first bout after his release from the UFC, Lambert lost a unanimous decision to Vladimir Matyushenko at Call to Arms I on May 16, 2009.

Lambert then faced Matt Horwich, at AMMA 1 - First Blood, on October 24, 2009. He lost the fight via split decision, posting a record of 0-2 since leaving the UFC.

He then fought twice in the C3 Fights promotion, defeating Dominic Brown and Wayne Cole by TKO and rear-naked choke submission respectively. The two wins in the promotion marked his first win streak since 2006.

Bellator MMA
Lambert signed with Bellator MMA and made his debut against former UFC veteran Hector Ramirez at Bellator 85. Lambert won the bout via armbar submission. He then faced Tom DeBlass at Bellator 108 on November 15, 2013. Lambert lost the fight via first round KO.

Championships and accomplishments
Icon Sport
SuperBrawl 24: Return of the Heavyweights Tournament Semifinals
Ultimate Fighting Championship
Fight of the Night (One time) vs. Renato Sobral 
Knockout of the Night (One time) vs. Renato Sobral 
World Extreme Cagefighting
WEC Light Heavyweight Championship (One time)

Mixed martial arts record

|-
| Loss
| align=center| 26–13
| Tom DeBlass
| KO (punch)
| Bellator 108
| 
| align=center| 1
| align=center| 1:45
| Atlantic City, New Jersey, United States
|
|-
| Win
| align=center| 26–12
| Hector Ramirez
| Submission (straight armbar)
| Bellator 85 
| 	
| align=center| 1
| align=center| 3:59
| Irvine, California, United States
| 
|-
| Loss
| align=center| 25–12
| Tony Lopez
| KO (knee)
| Powerhouse World Promotions: War on the Mainland
| 
| align=center| 2
| align=center| 1:49
| Irvine, California, United States
| 
|-
| Win
| align=center| 25–11
| Wayne Cole
| Submission (rear-naked choke)
| C3 Knockout: Rockout Weekend 3
| 
| align=center| 2
| align=center| 1:51
| Concho, Oklahoma, United States
| 
|-
| Win
| align=center| 24–11
| Dominic Brown
| TKO (punches)
| C3 Knockout: Rockout Weekend 2
| 
| align=center| 1
| align=center| 2:41
| Clinton, Oklahoma, United States
| 
|-
| Loss
| align=center| 23–11
| Matt Horwich
| Decision (split)
| AMMA 1: First Blood
| 
| align=center| 3
| align=center| 5:00
| Edmonton, Alberta, Canada
|Middleweight bout.
|-
| Loss
| align=center| 23–10
| Vladimir Matyushenko
| Decision (unanimous)
| Call to Arms I
| 
| align=center| 3
| align=center| 5:00
| Ontario, California, United States
| 
|-
| Loss
| align=center| 23–9
| Jason MacDonald
| Submission (rear-naked choke)
| UFC 88
| 
| align=center| 2
| align=center| 1:20
| Atlanta, Georgia, United States
| Middleweight bout.
|-
| Loss
| align=center| 23–8
| Luiz Cané
| TKO (punches)
| UFC 85
| 
| align=center| 1
| align=center| 2:07
| London, England
| 
|-
| Loss
| align=center| 23–7
| Wilson Gouveia
| KO (punch)
| UFC 80
| 
| align=center| 2
| align=center| 0:37
| Newcastle, England
| 
|-
| Win
| align=center| 23–6
| Renato Sobral
| KO (punch)
| UFC 68
| 
| align=center| 2
| align=center| 3:26
| Columbus, Ohio, United States
| Fight of the Night. Knockout of the Night.
|-
| Loss
| align=center| 22–6
| Rashad Evans
| KO (punches)
| UFC 63
| 
| align=center| 2
| align=center| 2:22
| Anaheim, California, United States
| 
|-
| Win
| align=center| 22–5
| Branden Lee Hinkle
| TKO (referee stoppage)
| UFC Fight Night 5
| 
| align=center| 1
| align=center| 5:00
| Las Vegas, Nevada, United States
| 
|-
| Win
| align=center| 21–5
| Terry Martin
| TKO (punches)
| UFC 59
| 
| align=center| 2
| align=center| 2:37
| Anaheim, California, United States
| 
|-
| Win
| align=center| 20–5
| Rob MacDonald
| Submission (kimura)
| UFC 58
| 
| align=center| 1
| align=center| 1:54
| Las Vegas, Nevada, United States
| 
|-
| Win
| align=center| 19–5
| Travis Wiuff
| KO (punches)
| FFC 15: Fiesta Las Vegas
| 
| align=center| 1
| align=center| 3:19
| Las Vegas, Nevada, United States
| 
|-
| Win
| align=center| 18–5
| Marvin Eastman
| Decision (split)
| KOTC: Mortal Sins
| 
| align=center| 3
| align=center| 5:00
| Primm, Nevada, United States
| 
|-
| Win
| align=center| 17–5
| Richard Montoya
| TKO (submission to punches)
|  WEC 13: Heavyweight Explosion
| 
| align=center| 1
| align=center| 2:45
| Lemoore, California, United States
| Won the vacant WEC Light Heavyweight Championship.
|-
| Win
| align=center| 16–5
| Matt Horwich
| TKO (submission to punches)
| WEC 12: Halloween Fury 3
| 
| align=center| 2
| align=center| 3:28
| Lemoore, California, United States
| 
|-
| Win
| align=center| 15–5
| Mike Rogers
| TKO (punches)
| ROTR 5: Rumble on the Rock 5
| 
| align=center| 1
| align=center| 3:29
| Honolulu, Hawaii, United States
| 
|-
| Loss
| align=center| 14–5
| Chael Sonnen
| Decision (unanimous)
| GC 20: Gladiator Challenge 20
| 
| align=center| 3
| align=center| 5:00
| Colusa, California, United States
| 
|-
| Win
| align=center| 14–4
| Brian Foster
| Decision (unanimous)
| KOTC 25: Flaming Fury
| 
| align=center| 2
| align=center| 5:00
| San Jacinto, California. United States
| 
|-
| Win
| align=center| 13–4
| Allan Sullivan
| TKO (punches)
| GC 16: Gladiator Challenge 16
| 
| align=center| 1
| align=center| N/A
| Colusa, California, United States
|Return to Light Heavyweight.
|-
| Win
| align=center| 12–4
| Jim Breech
| TKO (punches)
| KOTC 22: Steel Warrior
| 
| align=center| 1
| align=center| 1:35
| San Jacinto, California, United States
|Middleweight debut.
|-
| Win
| align=center| 11–4
| Rick Collup
| TKO (submission to punches)
| GC 14: Gladiator Challenge 14
| 
| align=center| 1
| align=center| 1:28
| Porterville, California, United States
|Heavyweight bout.
|-
| Loss
| align=center| 10–4
| Wesley Correira
| KO
| SB 27: SuperBrawl 27
| 
| align=center| 2
| align=center| 1:48
| Honolulu, Hawaii, United States
| Heavyweight bout. For the ICON Sport Heavyweight Championship.
|-
| Win
| align=center| 10–3
| Joshua Hoag
| TKO (punches)
| KOTC 17: Nuclear Explosion
| 
| align=center| 1
| align=center| 1:25
| San Jacinto, California, United States
| 
|-
| Win
| align=center| 9–3
| Dan Quinn
| Decision
| GC 12: Gladiator Challenge 12
| 
| align=center| 3
| align=center| 5:00
| Colusa, California, United States
| 
|-
| Win
| align=center| 8–3
| Lobo Lobo
| TKO (punches)
| KOTC 15: Bad Intentions
| 
| align=center| 1
| align=center| 3:01
| San Jacinto, California, United States
|Return to Light Heavyweight.
|-
| Loss
| align=center| 7–3
| Tim Sylvia
| TKO (doctor stoppage)
| SB 24: Return of the Heavyweights 2
| 
| align=center| 2
| align=center| 4:13
| Honolulu, Hawaii, United States
| SuperBrawl 24: Return of the Heavyweights Semifinals.
|-
| Win
| align=center| 6–3
| Brian Stromberg
| Submission (forearm choke)
| SB 24: Return of the Heavyweights 2
| 
| align=center| 2
| align=center| 4:59
| Honolulu, Hawaii, United States
| SuperBrawl 24: Return of the Heavyweights Quarterfinals.
|-
| Win
| align=center| 6–2
| Ron Faircloth
| Decision (unanimous)
| SB 24: Return of the Heavyweights 1
| 
| align=center| 2
| align=center| 5:00
| Honolulu, Hawaii, United States
| SuperBrawl 24: Return of the Heavyweights First Round.
|-
| Win
| align=center| 5–2
| Jason Jones
| TKO (punches)
| KOTC 12: Cold Blood
| 
| align=center| 2
| align=center| 1:17
| San Jacinto, California, United States
|Light Heavyweight bout.
|-
| Win
| align=center| 4–2
| Kauai Kupihea
| Submission (choke)
| GC 8: School Yard Brawls
| 
| align=center| 2
| align=center| 2:03
| California, United States
| 
|-
| Loss
| align=center| 3–2
| Marco Ruas
| Submission (heel hook)
| UP 1: Ultimate Pankration 1
| 
| align=center| 1
| align=center| 0:56
| Cabazon, California, United States
| 
|-
| Loss
| align=center| 3–1
| Kim Jong Wang
| Submission (guillotine choke)
| KOTC 11: Domination
| 
| align=center| 1
| align=center| 0:55
| San Jacinto, California, United States
|Return to Heavyweight.
|-
| Win
| align=center| 3–0
| Rick Mathis
| TKO (punches)
| KOTC 9: Showtime
| 
| align=center| 1
| align=center| 4:30
| San Jacinto, California, United States
|Light Heavyweight debut.
|-
| Win
| align=center| 2–0
| Adrian Perez
| TKO (punches)
| GC 3: Showdown at Soboba
| 
| align=center| 1
| align=center| 1:07
| Friant, California, United States
| 
|-
| Win
| align=center| 1–0
| Jorge Lavama
| Submission (keylock)
| GC 2: Collision at Colusa
| 
| align=center| 1
| align=center| 3:45
| Colusa, California, United States
|

References

External links 
 
 

1977 births
Living people
American male mixed martial artists
Mixed martial artists from California
Middleweight mixed martial artists
Mixed martial artists utilizing Brazilian jiu-jitsu
World Extreme Cagefighting champions
American practitioners of Brazilian jiu-jitsu
People from Victorville, California
People from Long Beach, California
Ultimate Fighting Championship male fighters